John Francis Fitzgerald (born September 15, 1933) is an American former professional baseball player who pitched one game in Major League Baseball with the 1958 San Francisco Giants.

Fitzgerald was playing American Legion Baseball in New York City in 1952 when he was signed by the New York Giants and assigned to the Northern League.

On September 28, 1958, at Seals Stadium — in the last game of the  MLB season — he pitched in one games for the Giants, started it, and threw three innings against the St. Louis Cardinals. He struck out three batters, and gave up just one hit, a home run to Joe Cunningham. His three strikeouts came in the second inning when he fanned the side, setting down Ken Boyer (an 11-time All-Star and future National League MVP), Gene Green, and Bobby Gene Smith. The Giants would defeat the Cardinals, 7–2, with relief pitcher Dom Zanni getting credit for the win.

Fitzgerald returned to the minor leagues in 1959 and left baseball in 1960.

References

External links

1933 births
Living people
Corpus Christi Giants players
Dallas Eagles players
Danville Leafs players
Johnstown Johnnies players
Major League Baseball pitchers
Phoenix Giants players
St. Cloud Rox players
San Francisco Giants players
Springfield Giants players
Sportspeople from Brooklyn
Baseball players from New York City
Midwood High School alumni